Same-sex marriage in the District of Columbia has been legal since March 3, 2010. On December 18, 2009, Mayor Adrian Fenty signed a bill passed by the D.C. Council on December 15 legalizing same-sex marriage. Following the signing, the measure entered a mandatory congressional review of 30 work days. Marriage licenses became available on March 3, and marriages began on March 9, 2010. The District of Columbia became the first jurisdiction in the United States below the Mason–Dixon line to allow same-sex couples to marry.

In addition to recognizing same-sex marriages, the District has also allowed residents to enter into registered domestic partnerships since 1992. Since the passage of the Domestic Partnership Judicial Determination of Parentage Act of 2009, the District has recognized civil unions and domestic partnerships performed in other jurisdictions that have all the rights and responsibilities of marriage. The law gives the mayor discretion to recognize relationships from states with lesser benefits.

Domestic partnerships
Domestic partnerships in the District of Columbia are open to both same-sex and opposite-sex couples. One of the unusual features of the original bill establishing domestic partnerships was that it allowed partnerships to be created between people who were related by blood (e.g., siblings or a parent and adult child, provided both were single). All couples registered as domestic partners are entitled to the same rights as family members and spouses to visit their domestic partners in hospital and jail and to make decisions concerning the treatment of a domestic partner's remains and estate after the partner's death.

The measure also grants a number of benefits to District government employees. Domestic partners are eligible for health insurance coverage, can use annual leave or unpaid leave for the birth or adoption of a dependent child or to care for a domestic partner or a partner's dependents, and can make funeral arrangements for a deceased partner.

Legislative history
The original bill establishing domestic partnerships in the District of Columbia was known as the Health Benefits Expansion Act. It was passed by the D.C. Council and signed into law by Mayor Sharon Pratt. The bill became law on June 11, 1992. Every year between 1992 and 2002, the Republican leadership of the U.S. Congress added a rider to the District of Columbia appropriations bill that prohibited the use of federal or local funds to implement the Act. The law was finally implemented in 2002, a fiscal year, after Congress failed to add the rider to the appropriations bill.

Since the 2002 implementation of domestic partnerships, the benefits attached to domestic partnerships have been expanded many times. In the Health Care Decisions Act of 2003, domestic partners were given the right to make health care decisions for their partner. The Deed Recordation Tax and Related Amendments Amendment Act of 2004 provided equal treatment, like spouses, to domestic partners for the purpose of paying the deed recordation tax. Expanding benefits further, the Department of Motor Vehicles Reform Amendment Act of 2004 exempted domestic partners from the excise tax payable for transfer of title to their partners, and the Domestic Partnership Protection Amendment Act of 2004 amended the definition of the term "marital status" in the Human Rights Act of 1997 to include domestic partners.

The Domestic Partnership Equality Amendment Act of 2006 was a major expansion of the benefits of domestic partners. The law came into effect on April 4, 2006. This act provides that in almost all cases a domestic partner will have the same rights as a spouse regarding inheritance, probate, guardianship, and certain other rights traditionally accorded to spouses. The act also gave the right to form premarital agreements for prospective partners, and for domestic partners to not testify against their partner in court. However, it does not extend most benefits of civil marriage to domestic partners, such as the marital estate tax deduction. At the time of this latest expansion coming into effect in April 2006, there were 587 registered couples.

The District of Columbia once again incrementally expanded domestic partnership rights when in March 2007 the right to jointly file local taxes as domestic partners became law with the passage of the Domestic Partnerships Joint Filing Act of 2006. On May 6, 2008, the D.C. Council unanimously passed the Omnibus Domestic Partnership Equality Amendment Act of 2008. According to the Washington Blade, "the law provides both rights and obligations for domestic partners in a total of 39 separate laws that touch on such areas as rental housing, condominiums, real estate transactions, nursing homes, life insurance, worker's compensation, investigations into child abuse and the police department's musical band, among other areas", thus "bringing the law to a point where same-sex couples who register as domestic partners will receive most, but not quite all, of the rights and benefits of marriage under District law".

On May 20, 2009, the Domestic Partnership Judicial Determination of Parentage Act 2009 was passed and signed into law, providing recognition of domestic partnerships conducted in other states and amending DC laws on parentage entitlements and rights to children from domestic partnerships. The law became effective on July 20, 2009.

Same-sex marriage

Dean v. District of Columbia
On January 19, 1995, the District of Columbia Court of Appeals issued its ruling in Dean v. District of Columbia. In this case, Craig Robert Dean and Patrick Gerard Gill, a couple who met all of the District's requirements for a marriage license except for being of the same sex, sought an order to compel the District to issue them a marriage license. The court upheld a lower court decision denying them the license, finding that the District's marriage statute did not contemplate same-sex marriages despite being gender-neutral, that denying the license did not violate District law against discrimination based on sex or sexual orientation and that denying the license did not violate the Due Process Clause of the United States Constitution.

Recognition of out-of-state marriages
On April 7, 2009, the same day that Vermont legalized same-sex marriage, the Council voted unanimously (12–0) to recognize same-sex marriages performed in other jurisdictions. The move was hailed as a possible gateway to the legalization of same-sex marriage in the near future. Under the District's procedures, the bill was voted on again on May 5, 2009, passing with a 12–1 vote. The act was signed by Mayor Adrian Fenty and was subject to a review period, which expired on July 7, 2009.

On June 13, the Board of Elections ruled that a petition seeking to repeal the law and delay its enactment until a vote was held in a referendum, would be invalid as it would violate provisions of the Human Rights Act which specifically disallow the public's voting against several protected classes—one being, sexual orientation. On June 30, 2009, a D.C. Superior Court judge ruled against a group opposed to the new law who wanted a referendum on the issue and had also asked the court to delay the enactment of the new law until the court decided the full case. The group had filed with the court three weeks after the passage of the new law. Judge Judith E. Retchin ruled "there was no excuse" for them to file their lawsuit so late. She also agreed with the Board's decision that allowing a vote on the issue would violate the Human Rights Act.

Religious Freedom And Civil Marriage Equality Amendment Act 2009

D.C. Councilman David Catania introduced the Religious Freedom And Civil Marriage Equality Amendment Act 2009 on October 6, 2009 to allow same-sex couples to marry in the District.

On November 17, the Board of Elections rejected a proposed ballot measure to ban same-sex marriage, saying that the proposed ballot measure "authorizes discrimination prohibited under the District of Columbia Human Rights Act."

On December 1, 2009, the same-sex marriage bill passed by a vote of 11–2 in its first reading. The second reading was held on December 15, 2009 where the measure was again passed by a vote of 11–2. The bill received Mayor Fenty's signature on December 18 and had to survive a 30-day congressional review period before becoming law. It was considered unlikely that the law would be overturned; the District Government estimated that the law would take effect on March 3, 2010. Marriage licenses became available on March 3. Due to the waiting period between obtaining a marriage license and getting married, the very first same-sex marriages in the District of Columbia were performed on March 9. Angelisa Young and Sinjoyla Townsend were the first couple to marry on Tuesday morning, March 9 at the headquarters of the Human Rights Campaign.

The definition of marriage in the District of Columbia was amended to the following:

On March 25, 2010, during debate on a health care bill, the U.S. Senate defeated an attempt by Utah Senator Bob Bennett to "suspend the issuance of marriage licenses to any couple of the same sex until the people of the District of Columbia have the opportunity to hold a referendum or initiative on the question".

Legal challenges
Bishop Harry R. Jackson, Jr., the pastor of the Hope Christian Church in Beltsville, Maryland, sued the District after the Board of Elections refused to approve a ballot initiative on the issue of same-sex marriage. The Board stated that such an initiative would violate the District's human rights laws. In January 2010, the D.C. Superior Court upheld the board's decision. On May 4, 2010, the D.C. Court of Appeals heard an appeal of the Superior Court's decision in Jackson v. D.C. Board of Elections and Ethics. Attorneys argued that the D.C. Council acted within District laws in voting on and eventually passing the legislation. On July 15, 2010, the Court of Appeals upheld the Superior Court's decision in a 5–4 decision. The U.S. Supreme Court on January 18, 2011 rejected Jackson's appeal without comment.

Economic impact
A 2009 study from the University of California, Los Angeles concluded that extending marriage to same-sex couples would boost the District of Columbia's economy by over $52.2 million over three years, which would generate increases in local government tax and fee revenues by $5.4 million and create approximately 700 new jobs.

Demographics and marriage statistics
Data from the 2000 U.S. census showed that 3,678 same-sex couples were living in Washington, D.C.. Same-sex couples lived in all wards of the District, and constituted 5.1% of coupled households and 1.5% of all households. Same-sex partners in Washington, D.C. were on average younger than opposite-sex partners, more likely to be employed, and more likely to have a college degree. In addition, the average and median household incomes of same-sex couples were higher than different-sex couples, and 64% of same-sex couples owned their homes. 8% of same-sex couples in Washington, D.C. were raising children under the age of 18, with an estimated 441 children living in households headed by same-sex couples in 2005.

Public opinion
A January 2010 poll for The Washington Post found that 56% of District of Columbia residents were in favor of same-sex marriage, while 35% were opposed.

A 2017 Public Religion Research Institute (PRRI) poll found that 78% of District of Columbia residents supported same-sex marriage, while 17% were opposed and 5% were unsure. When consideration was given to the entire Washington metropolitan area (which contains parts of neighboring Virginia, Maryland and West Virginia), support was at 69% and opposition at 22%; 9% were undecided. A PRRI survey conducted between March 8 and November 9, 2021 showed that 86% of D.C. respondents supported same-sex marriage, while 14% opposed. This level of support was the highest in the United States, followed by Massachusetts at 85% and Minnesota, Rhode Island and Washington at 82%.

See also
LGBT rights in the District of Columbia
Same-sex marriage in the United States

References

External links
Information on domestic partnerships, D.C. Department of Health
Text of the Religious Freedom And Civil Marriage Equality Amendment Act 2009

District of Columbia law
LGBT in Washington, D.C.
DC
2010 in LGBT history